The eleventh season of the Case Closed anime was directed by Yasuichiro Yamamoto and produced by TMS Entertainment and Yomiuri Telecasting Corporation. The series is based on Gosho Aoyama's Case Closed manga series. In Japan, the series is titled  but was changed due to legal issues with the title Detective Conan. The episodes' plot follows Conan Edogawa's daily adventures.

The episodes use six pieces of theme music: two opening themes and four ending themes. The first opening theme is "I can't stop my love for you♥" by Rina Aiuchi until episode 305. The first ending theme is  until episode 287. The third ending theme is "Overture" by Koshi Inaba until episode 306.

The season initially ran from July 15, 2002, through April 14, 2003 on Nippon Television Network System in Japan. Episodes 286 to 315 were later collected into eight DVD compilations by Shogakukan. They were released between 	March 25, 2005, and June 24, 2005, in Japan.


Episode list

References
General

Specific

2002 Japanese television seasons
2003 Japanese television seasons
Season11